The Gav-Paradhi are one of the Paradhi Tribes of India. Unlike the other Paradhi tribes they were not classed as a 'Criminal Tribe' by the British Raj government, under Criminal Tribes Act 1871. This was because unlike the other Paradhi tribes like the Phase Pardhi, the Gav-Paradhi had become settled agriculturalists.

The Gav-Paradhi live primarily in the Amravati District.

References

Amravati district
Ethnic groups in India
Social groups of Maharashtra